St Ignatius' College is a Catholic voluntary aided secondary school for boys aged 11–18 in Enfield, London, England, founded by the Society of Jesus. It was formerly a grammar school, only accepting boys who had passed the Eleven plus exam.

History
The school was founded in Stamford Hill, South Tottenham, London, on 10 September 1894. The college and the Jesuit community were initially accommodated in two houses called Morecombe Lodge and Burleigh House, located near Tottenham High Road. The school originally had only 46 boys, four Jesuits, and a dog in 1894. In 1907 the college was recognised by the Board of Education and began to receive public money towards its support.

From the early 1950s the school complement averaged about 700 boys. Its longest serving Headmaster, Fr Guy Brinkworth SJ, retired in 1963. The school remained at Stamford Hill as a grammar school until 1968. The school then became a two-tier, seven-form entry comprehensive school, the lower school being located at the old Cardinal Allen School, which had been there for eight years prior to the school moving there, and the upper school located in Turkey Street, Enfield.

In 1987, the lower and upper schools amalgamated at Turkey Street, a development made possible by a major building programme. The school became grant maintained in 1993 but returned to Voluntary Aided status in September 1999. At the centenary celebrations in 1994, the newly refurbished chapel was unveiled, and every pupil received a book detailing the history of the school and its past teachers. In 1998 the school started to build the Octagon which houses a computer suite and a library. The building work was completed in 2000 and was handed over to the school later that year. Also in 2000, the newly refurbished Roselands Centre for the Sixth Form was opened. In 2006 the school raised £50,000 through various events held at the school and donations from past pupils. School enrollment has risen to 1,300 pupils.

Michael Blundell became the college's first lay Headmaster when he succeeded Fr Antony Forrester SJ, in 1986. Mr Blundell was in turn succeeded as Headmaster by Paul Adams, who retired in the summer of 2007, and was replaced by John-Paul Morrison, who left the post of headmaster in December 2013. Andrew Dickson took over the post on an interim basis until a replacement for John-Paul Morrison could be found. Kelly took over from Dickson in 2014 and retired from his role in 2016 and was succeeded by Mrs O'Keeffe, the first female headteacher of a Jesuit secondary school in the United Kingdom.

Loyola Preparatory School
In 1900, the college began a preparatory department. However, in 1944 this preparatory department became Loyola Preparatory School, a Roman Catholic private boys preparatory school run by the Jesuits. In 1950, Loyola Preparatory School moved to a site in Buckhurst Hill in Essex that was formerly occupied by Braeside School. In 1962, Campion School, a Jesuit secondary school, was opened in Hornchurch, making Loyola Preparatory School a feeder school for both the college and Campion School.

In 2001, trusteeship of Loyola Preparatory School was given to the Diocese of Brentwood and as of 2017, Loyola Preparatory School teaches boys from the ages of 3 to 11 and has 190 pupils.

In 2017, Loyola Preparatory School became the best Under-11 school football team in England by winning the national final of the Danone Nations Cup at the Bet365 Stadium.

School buildings

Main building
The present building was first occupied in January 1968, staff and boys moving from the Stamford Hill site. The main building of the school has since seen improvements made to it such as new extensions. Years 7 to 11 occupy this building. There are three floors, each one holding at least three departments.

Originally the school only used two floors for years 7 to 11, and the Sixth Form occupied the 3rd floor. However, overcrowding again became a problem and the school acquired the "Roselands" building from the Jesuits who had a place of residence there. The school also built another floor on top of the current technology wing to serve as the "first line" block. In this extension project a section dedicated to the study of music and a gym, commonly known to students as the "new gym", were built. In 1987 there was another extension which added several new rooms to the side of the building, one of which is the current staff room. In 1999 a further extension, known as the Octagon was built.

Roselands
Roselands was originally built as a place of residence for the Jesuit community. However, as the number of priests in Roselands diminished, the Jesuits no longer saw fit to occupy the Roselands site and sold off the building to the main school. Roselands has now become the place for the Sixth Form to study, however some subjects such as science cannot be taught in Roselands since there is no facility to and, as a consequence, some sixth form students have to go to the main building.

The Octagon
The Octagon is a two-story octagonal building on the site which houses the computer suite and the Loyola Library, and was opened in 1999. On the top floor there was an ICT suite which contained 40 computers, as well as various smaller offices dedicated to tasks such as housing the servers and ICT teachers. However, this has since been refurbished again and the upper storey now houses a chapel. On the bottom floor is a library containing a vast array of books primarily for study, but there is a large selection of fiction too. The library is open at lunch time for pupils to study in.

CCF hut
Where the school's Combined Cadet Force (ccf) contingent's training is centred. It is used both for the administration of the contingent and the training of the cadets.

Religious life
The college aims to assist each individual pupil in his spiritual development. This spiritual development includes retreats as pupils progress through the school.

Motto
The school motto Ad maiorem Dei gloriam – meaning "For the greater glory of God" – was abbreviated to AMDG and is still customarily appended to students' essays or homework.

Mass

The first formal act of each school day is Mass every morning in the College Chapel before school, when the school day and school community is offered up to God. The whole school meets for Mass at the beginning of each academic year and at the conclusion of each term. All pupils have an opportunity to attend Mass on holy days of obligation and on some other major feasts.

Morning prayers
At the beginning of each day at registration, the whole form class says a prayer from the college diary, so pupils are reminded that the work they do is for the greater glory of God (AMDG). Pupils are invited to say the Rosary during May and October, Advent prayer, and Stations of the Cross during Lent.

Chaplaincy team
Helping in all aspects of religious life is the College Chaplain. The Chaplain often celebrates Mass for the school and at special college occasions. Members of the college from various years help with running Masses, for both year groups and the whole school. These boys are called sacristans, and are headed by the master of ceremonies, an upper sixth form student.

Chaplaincy groups
There are four groups that members of the Sixth Form can join. These groups help to run spiritual activities and help to celebrate the Mass. They are:
 Arrupe – arrange retreats
 Gonzaga – paired reading scheme
 Loyola – justice and peace
 Ogilvie – Extraordinary ministers of Holy Communion

Retreat opportunities
The opportunity for pupils regularly to take part in retreats, devised and directed according to their stage at the school, is an essential part of the Jesuit educational ideal. A retreat is a time when, away from their usual environments of home and school, the pupils can reflect on their lives and on their relationships with others and with God. The college offers a sequential programme of retreats, carefully structured in content and style to address the perennial and changing needs of the pupils as they move through the school. Members of Years 7, 9 and 11 have retreat days each year and these take place in the Pastoral Centre, a detached property which stands on the college site. Residential retreats are organised for members of the upper years, Year 10 and the Sixth Form. A variety of centres and formats are used. Recently, these retreats have been held at St John's Beaumont, a Jesuit youth centre in Hampstead, and at the De La Salle centre at Kintbury.

Awards
At the College there are a number of awards presented, usually for good behaviour or for exceptional work. These are chiefly:
Commendations – A small certificate that says the name of the pupil and how they attained the award.
Merits – For exceptional work or a greater achievement; these are presented in front of the school.

Speech Day
The college has an annual speech day, normally held around the end of November. At speech day a vast array of prizes are awarded. In years 8 to 11, each class has prizes for general attainment, general effort, and religious education, which are awarded based on their achievements in the previous school year. Also, one pupil from each class in years 8 to 11 is awarded the class prize. For the lower Sixth Form there is a single prize in each subject. There are also 15 college prizes, each of which has its own criteria for winning. The recipients of all of these prizes are determined by the relevant staff.

At speech day, GCSE and A-Level certificates are also distributed. Speeches are normally made by the headmaster and the principal guest.

Prefecture
When students enter the Sixth Form they are given a recommendation from their previous head of year if they should become prefects or not. Prefects are appointed by the Headmaster, in consultation with the Head of Sixth Form and his tutorial staff. At the college, a prefect is identified by his maroon tie, while a normal Sixth Form student wears a blue tie.

College Captaincy
The title of College Captain is the highest honour that a student can receive. Before Easter, the current College Captain and his Vice will write up a short-list on those they believe should take over next year. The Headmaster, who selects the Captain and Vice Captains, is not bound by the results of the poll. The Captain and the 2 Vice Captains are announced at the college Mass at the end of the Spring Term. Recently, a new system has been introduced: one college captain, one vice captain, and several "head prefects".

Houses
The school's forms were formerly based upon ability. However, the forms have since been changed into mixed ability, with some subjects independently adopting a 'set' system. The St Francis Xavier forms were added as commemoration for the college's 125th Anniversary. The forms are named after seven Jesuit martyrs:

 Garnet, after St Thomas Garnet, SJ (1575–1608)
 Southwell, after St Robert Southwell, SJ (1560–1595)
 Arrowsmith, after St Edmund Arrowsmith, SJ (1585–1628)
 Campion, after St Edmund Campion, SJ (1540–1581)
 Lewis, after St David Lewis, SJ (1616–1679)
 Page, after Blessed Francis Page, SJ (15?? - 1602)
Xavier, after St Francis Xavier, SJ (1506 - 1552)

Pupils change forms due to misbehaviour. This can take place at any time the head of year feels necessary but usually happens around in between terms or years.

Extracurricular activities

Publications

The Ignatian
The Ignatian, the college magazine, is published yearly and features a selection of highlights from the previous school year. Pictures of art and reports on music and sport in the college are normally included, along with the Headmaster's report. It is produced and edited by members of the Sixth Form. It is customary to ask the Art students to produce a piece of artwork that will become the front cover of The Ignatian. The Deputy Head, as editor, will ask students and other sixth form students to write articles that can be included in the magazine. The editors will usually complete the magazine before the start of summer holidays so that when the pupils return the next year they can get a copy.

Yearbook
For the first time in the school's history, in 2006, it was decided to produce a yearbook for the outgoing year 11, with an art pupil being asked to produce its front cover.

College newsletter
Every Half Term a newsletter, summarising the college's achievements for that half term, is published. It includes a list of merits attained for that half term.

CCF
The college has a Contingent of the Combined Cadet Force. The Contingent has both an Army Section and a Royal Air Force (RAF) Section. Weekly Section training takes place on Mondays at the college. Cadets also get the chance to attend camps, Field Training Exercises (FTX), Adventurous Training (AT), and courses throughout the UK and occasionally abroad. Courses include flying, parachuting, signalling, catering, physical training instructor (PTI), schoolboy commando course, mountain leader training, and rock climbing.

Sports
Sports played at the College include: Football, Rugby union, Basketball, Tennis, Cross country running, Cricket, Swimming, and Cycling. The school has a prestigious sporting record, regularly attending sporting tournaments throughout the UK. One notable achievement from one of the tournaments is the under-11's winning a mini-bus for the school. The school recently signed a deal with Tottenham Hotspur to allow the use of Tottenham's playing fields.

Old Ignatian Association
Former pupils of the school are commonly referred to as Old Ignatians. The main objective of the Old Ignatian Association is to serve the interests of the former pupils of the college. They provide spiritual, social, recreational, and sporting facilities so that they may serve the interests of not only the Old Ignatians but also of current pupils.

Although having been in existence for many years, the Old Ignatian Association changed dramatically in the early 1960s. Through the efforts of a dedicated and enthusiastic group of Old Ignatians a sports ground was acquired and a pavilion built on a site in Woodford. In the 1970s the proposed motorway, the M11, caused the association to be subject to a compulsory purchase order and they were left without a suitable meeting place throughout the late 1970s.

In 1999 the Old Ignatians purchased a former sports ground in Turkey Street, Enfield, and made plans to build their new headquarters there. Their plans were to re-establish a social centre and to provide some new sporting facilities that were not available in the Woodford centre. Their plan also was to make sure that the facilities at the new site not only cater to sports-minded people, but the less so as well. In 2002, after obtaining planning permission for the new pavilion, building began. The now completed pavilion named "The Loyola Ground" was opened in 2008 and is used by the Association as well as the school for sporting, social, and many other events.

Old Ignatian Football Club
The Old Ignatian Football Club is open to former and present pupils of the college to play football on Saturday afternoons throughout the season. They run 7 teams plus a vets side on a Sunday so every level of ability is catered for. With the new clubhouse completed the OIFC once again had a place they could call home after many years without a base. They now play their home matches on the main pitch as well as sharing the schools bulls cross pitches at the Loyola Ground on Saturday afternoons.

Discipline

History
Most Old Ignatians will recall the form of corporal punishment administered at the school. The cane was never used; instead it was the ferula (whale bone covered in a heavy rubber called gutta percha) which was administered on both hands, half the awarded strokes on each. Two types of ferula or "tolly" were used – the one mentioned above for the lower school and a longer one for the upper school. In serious cases the punishment would be "twice six" on both hands, but administered on separate days on account of the hand becoming numb. The ferula was usually administered in the current technology wing on the bottom floor. Adding psychological to corporal punishment, offenders were given a week to decide when they would receive their ferula, otherwise additional punishment was liable to be added (according to the school rules). Corporal punishment ended in the early 1990s.

Discipline today
Nowadays, discipline is in the form of a detention which is 1 hour long and takes place after school with the subject tutor. In extreme circumstances, teachers can issue a 2-hour detention called an SLT detention. For serious offences, pupils can either be placed in Manresa (in-school suspension), or excluded fixed-term (suspension) or full-term (expelled).

Curriculum

Key Stage 3
At Key Stage 3 Pupils follow the same subjects for Years 7-9:

Key Stage 4
All pupils must take Maths, Science (Double Science), English, Religious Education and Physical Education and choose other subjects for their GCSEs:

* Technology is split into 3 groups; Resistant Materials, Graphic Products, Food Technology

Key Stage 5
Entry to the Sixth Form is subject to a satisfactory report from the Year 11 Line Master and an interview with the Head of the Sixth Form. Pupils may take a one-year BTEC course in either Business Studies or Information Systems, or AS/A2 Levels. To take AS/A2 Levels pupils must have gained a minimum of 5 A* to C grades at GCSE level in a suitable combination of subjects and received a recommendation from the appropriate Head of Department. Pupils can then choose from:

Performance
In 2007, 69.9% of pupils were awarded at least 5 A*-C Grades in their GCSEs. This was down 3.9% from 2006 but up 3.2% from 2005. The pass rate for Advanced Level exams was 97.9% of exams passed in 2007 (up 1.8% from 2006), of which 39.8% were with A or B grades (up 6% from 2006).

Notable alumni

See also 
 List of Jesuit sites in the United Kingdom
 List of Jesuit schools

References

External links

 St Ignatius' College, Enfield

Catholic secondary schools in the Archdiocese of Westminster
Jesuit secondary schools in England
Educational institutions established in 1894
Boys' schools in London
Secondary schools in the London Borough of Enfield
1894 establishments in England
Voluntary aided schools in London
Enfield, London